Fan Fair or FanFair may refer to:

 CMA Music Festival, a country music festival in Tennessee
 Fantasia Fair, a transgender and cross-dressing conference in Massachusetts
 Fan Fair (EP), a 2011 EP by Baiyu

See also
 Fanfare (disambiguation)